, colloquially abbreviated to {KSGU}, was a private non-sectarian and coeducational university located in Kobe, Japan. Established in 2007, it had been specialized in Tourism Studies. However, mainly due to the financial problems occurred in the management body, the university stopped admitting students from 2015 and almost all staffs and students moved to Kobe Yamate University after establishing a Tourism department there.

History
2007 - Kobe Shukugawa Gakuin University was established as a four-year university for the education of tourism professionals.
2013 - Shukugawa Gakuin College moved its campus to the university.
2014 - Shukugawa Gakuin announced that it stops admitting students of this university.
2015 - Department of Tourism was established in Kobe Yamate University in succession to School of Tourism, Kobe Shukugawa Gakuin University.

Campus
The campus of Kobe Shukugawa Gakuin University was located on Port Island in Kobe. 
Port Island Campus - (1-3-11 Minatojima, Kobe, Hyogo 650-0045)

Organization

Faculty (Undergraduate Programs) 
 School of Tourism
 Department of Tourism
 Culture and Nature Tourism
 Health Tourism
 Airlines and Cruise Tourism
 Hotel Management and Coordinating Events

Attached organizations 
 Research Center for English Education
 Research Center for Tourism Education
 Research Center for Region
 Career Center
 Extension Center

See also
 Kobe Yamate University
 Shukugawa Gakuin College

References

External links
 
Official Facebook page

Private universities and colleges in Japan
Educational institutions established in 2007
Universities and colleges in Hyōgo Prefecture
2007 establishments in Japan
Defunct private universities and colleges in Japan